Mary D' Potter is a Philippine comedy on ABS-CBN. It aired from September 15, 2001 to November 9, 2002, replacing Kaya ni Mister, Kaya ni Misis and was replaced by Bida si Mister, Bida si Misis.

The series is currently streaming on Jeepney TV's YouTube Channel everyday at 8:00 pm.

Cast
 Maricel Soriano as Mary Panyurutan
 Nova Villa as Nang Gelay
 Serena Dalrymple as Kelly
 Izza Ignacio as Jessa Sarabusab
 Mel Martinez as Terry
 Meryll Soriano as Geri
 Yuuki Kadooka as Buknoy
 Herbert Bautista as Kuling Sarabusab

See also
 List of programs broadcast by ABS-CBN

ABS-CBN original programming
2001 Philippine television series debuts
2002 Philippine television series endings
Filipino-language television shows